Yuri Confortola (born 24 April 1986) is a short-track speed skater who competed for Italy at the 2006 Winter Olympics, at the 2010 Winter Olympics, at the 2014 Winter Olympics, at the 2018 Winter Olympics and at the 2022 Winter Olympics.

References

External links

1986 births
Living people
Italian male short track speed skaters
Olympic short track speed skaters of Italy
Short track speed skaters at the 2006 Winter Olympics
Short track speed skaters at the 2010 Winter Olympics
Short track speed skaters at the 2014 Winter Olympics
Short track speed skaters at the 2018 Winter Olympics
Short track speed skaters at the 2022 Winter Olympics
Olympic silver medalists for Italy
Olympic bronze medalists for Italy
Medalists at the 2022 Winter Olympics
Olympic medalists in short track speed skating
Speed skaters of Centro Sportivo Carabinieri
World Short Track Speed Skating Championships medalists